The Bokoni mine is a large open pit mine located in the north-eastern part of South Africa in Polokwane, Limpopo.

References 

Platinum mines in South Africa
Economy of Limpopo